5771 Somerville, provisional designation , is a carbonaceous Lixiaohua asteroid from the outer regions of the asteroid belt, approximately 26 kilometers in diameter. It was discovered on 21 September 1987, by American astronomer Edward Bowell at the Anderson Mesa Station of the Lowell Observatory in Flagstaff, Arizona. The asteroid was named for Scottish polymath Mary Somerville.

Orbit and classification 

Somerville is a member of the Lixiaohua family, an outer-belt asteroid family with more than 700 known members, consisting of C-type and X-type asteroids. The family's namesake is 3556 Lixiaohua.

The asteroid orbits the Sun in the outer main-belt at a distance of 2.4–3.8 AU once every 5 years and 7 months (2,029 days). Its orbit has an eccentricity of 0.22 and an inclination of 8° with respect to the ecliptic. The body's observation arc begins with its official discovery observation at Flagstaff.

Physical characteristics 

Somerville is an assumed C-type asteroid.

Rotation period 

In March 2012, a rotational lightcurve of Somerville was obtained from photometric observations by American astronomer Brian Warner at his Palmer Divide Observatory in Colorado. Lightcurve analysis gave a rotation period of 9.20 hours with a brightness amplitude of 0.80 magnitude.

Diameter and albedo 

According to the surveys carried out by the Japanese Akari satellite and the NEOWISE mission of NASA's Wide-field Infrared Survey Explorer, Somerville measures between 24.90 and 33.60 kilometers in diameter  and its surface has an albedo between 0.017 and 0.04.

The Collaborative Asteroid Lightcurve Link derives an albedo of 0.0407 and a diameter of 22.84 kilometers based on an absolute magnitude of 12.3.

Naming 

This minor planet was named after Mary Somerville (1780–1872; née Fairfax), a Scottish polymath and science writer who studied mathematics and astronomy. She is considered to be one of Europe's most distinguished women scientists of her time.  The official naming citation was published by the Minor Planet Center on 12 July.

Notes

References

External links 
 Asteroid Lightcurve Database (LCDB), query form (info )
 Dictionary of Minor Planet Names, Google books
 Asteroids and comets rotation curves, CdR – Observatoire de Genève, Raoul Behrend
 Discovery Circumstances: Numbered Minor Planets (5001)-(10000) – Minor Planet Center
 
 

005771
Discoveries by Edward L. G. Bowell
Named minor planets
19870921